Wilmot is a surname, and may refer to:

Andy Wilmot (born 1980), British racing driver
Arthur Wilmot (1845–1876), English clergyman and cricketer
Ben Wilmot (Benjamin Lewis Wilmot; born 1999), English footballer
Charles Wilmot, 1st Viscount Wilmot (c. 1572 – 1644), English soldier, Lord President of Connaught (1616–1644)
Chester Wilmot (1911–1954), Australian war correspondent
David Wilmot (1814–1868), American politician
David Wilmot (actor), Irish stage, screen and television actor
Sir Edward Wilmot, 1st Baronet (1693–1786), English physician
Elizabeth Wilmot, Countess of Rochester (1651–1681), wife of John Wilmot, 2nd Earl of Rochester
Elizabeth Montgomery (designer), married name Elizabeth Wilmot (1902–1993), English theatre and opera costume and scenic designer
Ern Wilmot (Ernest Ambrose Wilmot; 1898–1988), Australian rugby league player
Frank Wilmot (also known as Furnley Maurice; 1881–1942), Australian poet
Fred Wilmot (1927–2009), Canadian football player
Gary Wilmot (born 1954), British entertainer
Gilead J. Wilmot (born 1834), American soldier and politician, member of the Wisconsin State Senate
Grant Wilmot (1956–2016), Australian rules footballer
Henry Wilmot, 1st Earl of Rochester (1612–1658), British Royalist
Sir Henry Wilmot, 5th Baronet (1831–1901)
Henry Wilmot (politician) (1826–1888), Canadian politician
James Wilmot (1726–1807), clergyman and alleged creator of Baconian theory
James P. Wilmot (1911–1980), US aviation executive and Democratic Party organizer
John Wilmot, 2nd Earl of Rochester (1647–1680), British Libertine and satyrist
John Wilmot (politician) (1748–1815), British lawyer and politician, member of Parliament from 1776 to 1796
John Wilmot, 1st Baron Wilmot of Selmeston (1893–1964), British politician, Minister of Aircraft Production (1945–1946), Minister of Supply (1945–1947).
John Eardley Wilmot (1709–1792), English judge, Chief Justice of the Common Pleas (1766–1771)
John McNeil Wilmot (1755–1847), Canadian politician
Jorge Wilmot (1928–2012), Mexican artisan
Kate Wilmot, Anglican bishop in Australia
Katherine Wilmot (or Catherine Wilmot; c. 1773 – 1824), Irish traveller and diarist
Kilburn Wilmot (1911–1996), English cricketer 
Lemuel Allan Wilmot (1809–1878), Canadian lawyer, politician, and judge
Lorrie Wilmot (Anthony Lorraine Wilmot; 1943–2004), South African cricketer
Louise Currie Wilmot (born 1942), first female commander of a United States Naval base
Malcolm Wilmot (1771–1859), merchant and politician in New Brunswick
Mike Wilmot, Canadian comedian
Mollie Wilmot (née Mollie Netcher; 1923–2002), American philanthropist and socialite
Montague Wilmot (died 1766), British Governor of Nova Scotia (1763–1766)
Norah Wilmot (1889–1980), British racehorse trainer
Percy Wilmot (1881–1950), Australian rules footballer 
Reginald Wilmot (1869–1949), Australian sports journalist
Rhys Wilmot (born 1962), Welsh footballer
Richard Wilmot (1703–1772), Canon of Windsor (1748–1772)
Robert Wilmot (playwright) (c. 1550 – by 1608), Church of England clergyman, and playwright
Robert Duncan Wilmot (1809–1891), Canadian politician
Robert Duncan Wilmot Jr. (1837–1920), Canadian Member of Parliament, son of the above
Robert Wilmot (Gaelic footballer) (born 1954),  Irish Gaelic footballer and hurler
Sir Robert Wilmot, 1st Baronet (1708–1772), Secretary to the Lord Chamberlain of the Household
Sir Robert Wilmot, 2nd Baronet (c. 1752 – 23 July 1834), Secretary to the Lord Lieutenant of Ireland
Samuel Wilmot (1772–1848), Irish surgeon
Samuel Street Wilmot (1773–1856)  surveyor, tanner, farmer and political figure in Upper Canada
Tom Wilmot, Anglican bishop in Australia
Walt Wilmot (1863–1929), American baseball player
William Wilmot (1869–1957), English cricketer

See also
Baron Wilmot of Selmeston
Edward Parry Eardley-Wilmot (1843–1898), English civil servant
Edward Revell Eardley-Wilmot (1814–1899), Church of England clergyman
Hugh Eden Eardley-Wilmot (1850–1926), English barrister
Sir John Eardley-Wilmot, 1st Baronet (1783–1847), sixth Lieutenant-Governor of Tasmania
Sir John Eardley-Wilmot, 2nd Baronet (1810–1892), MP for South Warwickshire 1874–1885
Revell Eardley-Wilmot (1842–1922), British military officer, who served in Asia
Sydney Eardley-Wilmot (1847–1929), Royal Navy officer
William Assheton Eardley-Wilmot, 3rd Baronet (1841–1896), British Army officer, Deputy Assistant Adjutant General in Ireland (1879–1882)
Sir Robert Wilmot-Horton, 3rd Baronet (1784–1841), Governor of Ceylon
Alex Wilmot-Sitwell, British banker, partner at Perella Weinberg Partners
Peter Wilmot-Sitwell (1935–2018), British merchant banker and stockbroker
Robert Bradshaw Wilmot-Sitwell (1894–1946), Royal Navy officer

de:Wilmot
fr:Wilmot